Per Bronken (13 March 1935 – 4 October 2002) was a Norwegian poet, novelist, actor, film director and stage producer.

Career
Bronken made his literary debut in 1955 with the poetry collection Kom drikk også mitt blod. He made his stage debut at Riksteatret in 1957. He worked as stage producer for Fjernsynsteatret for several periods from 1962, and played an important role in the development of Norwegian television drama. He was awarded the Gyldendal's Endowment in 1961.

Personal life
Bronken was born in Tromsø, a son of merchant Alfred Sivertsen and nurse Ingeborg Bronken. He was married to actress Monna Tandberg from 1962 to 1971, and to actress  from 1974.

Filmography

External links

References

1935 births
2002 deaths
People from Tromsø
20th-century Norwegian poets
Norwegian male poets
Norwegian male stage actors
Norwegian theatre managers and producers
Norwegian male novelists
Norwegian male film actors
Norwegian film directors
20th-century Norwegian novelists
20th-century Norwegian male writers